Rodina Stadium is a sports venue in Kirov. It is the home of Rodina.

References

Bandy venues in Russia
Sport in Kirov, Kirov Oblast
Buildings and structures in Kirov Oblast